The Hiker is a statue created by Allen George Newman. Like Theo Alice Ruggles Kitson's statue of the same name, it was created to honor the American soldiers who took "long hikes in steaming jungles" during the Boxer Rebellion, the Spanish–American War and the Philippine–American War. Originally displayed in the New York building at the 1907 Jamestown Exposition, the statue was chosen by several camps of the United Spanish War Veterans to be erected as war memorials.

The statue, described as  ”The best bronze soldier in America” by sculptor and critic Lorado Taft, proved to be very popular, copies of it being located in numerous cities.  The Jno. Williams, Inc. foundry in New York City was “given exclusive rights for casting the statue ‘in real bronze’ “ adding that the sculptor Newman would “with great pleasure give his advice gratis as to the proper form for the pedestal according to its environment.”

The head is strongly poised on a sinewy column. The shoulders are broad, the chest full and deep. The flanks are thin, the hips narrow. The muscular legs show great marching capacity... There is a suggestion at the bow of the knee that he could ride a horse. His trusty Krag is not the first gun he has handled. You will not find that position in the manual, though the muzzle is elevated. It is equally handy to be aimed, clubbed or lunged. His head turns naturally a little to the right to balance the hat brim falling to the left. But the face is smooth shaven as was the mode—every part is strong, every feature clean cut, and all smoothly balanced. The lined cheeks show that in his 28 years he has lived. He is no saint. He is no molly-coddle. He is an American soldier. He is a disciplined man at arms, the wonder of the world today wherever such foregather. — Gen. Charles Wheaton Abbot, Jr., in his dedication of the statue at the North Burial Ground, Providence, Rhode Island, May 31, 1912.

Locations

Reliefs

A number of Spanish–American War memorials include a bronze relief showing Newman's Hiker in front of the battleship . Just under the statue's feet is engraved, "Hiker of '98." Included on the relief is President McKinley's quote, "You triumphed over obstacles which would have overcome men less brave and determined." 
Michigan City, Indiana, 1936
Albany, Georgia, 1937
Rome, Georgia, 1937
 Battelle Riverfront Park, Columbus, Ohio, 1937
 Bowling Green, Kentucky, 1938
Gainesville, Georgia, 1938
Salem, Oregon, 1938
Atlantic City, New Jersey, 1939
Stanford, Kentucky, 1939
Fitzgerald, Georgia, 1940
Athens, Georgia, 1941
Paducah, Kentucky, 1941
Augusta, Georgia, 1942
Brunswick, Georgia, 1947
Tampa, Florida, 1949, moved in 2003
Columbus, Georgia, 1953
Long Beach, California, 1955

Some of these relief memorials also carry the statement, "Every Man a Volunteer," and may also include the number 458,151. The total number of U.S. service personnel engaged in the war with Spain (proper), the Philippine–American War and the Boxer Rebellion numbered 458,151.

These bronze plaques were made by the Lamb Seal and Stencil Company, which was founded in 1900 by Richard L. Lamb (1871-1960). Lamb was a British immigrant who had fought in the Siege of Santiago in Cuba during the Spanish–American War.

References

Hiker (Newman), The